Alexander Leopoldovich Khvylya (born Bressem, Oleksandr Leopoldovych Khvylya; 15 July 1905 – 17 October 1976) was a Soviet theater and film actor who played in The Diamond Arm, The end of Chyrva Kozyr, Bohdan Khmelnytsky, and others. He was a People's Artist of the RSFSR (23 October 1963).

Khvylya was born in the Swedish colony in the village of Oleksandro-Shultyne (Yekaterinoslav Governorate, Russian Empire) to Swedish parents as Alexander Leopoldovich Bressem. Today the village is part of the Ivanopil rural community in Kostiantynivka Raion, Donetsk Oblast.

Career
In 1922, he graduated from the Vorovsky Drama Studio. Khvylya worked in the Zankovetska Music-Drama Theater from 1924 through 1926, then in Berezil that just relocated to Kharkiv from Kyiv. From 1934 until the German invasion of WWII, he worked in the Kharkiv Drama Theater of Shevchenko. Later, Khvylia relocated to Moscow, where he worked in the State theater of a cinema-actor.

Plays
 Dictatorship (Ivan Mykytenko) as Husak
 Perish of squadron (Oleksandr Korniychuk) as Baltiyets
 The Storm (Alexander Ostrovsky) as Kudryash
others

Selected Movies 
 1932 Ivan (Alexander Dovzhenko) as Orator (first role in movies)
 1938 Karmeliuk (Georgiy Tasin) as Karmeliuk
 1941 Bohdan Khmelnytsky (Ihor Savchenko) as Kobzar
 1942 Oleksandr Parkhomenko (Leonid Lukov) as Parkhomenko
 1946 The Liberated Earth
 1946 The Vow as Semyon Budyonny
 1948 Red Necktie as Vishnyakov
 1948 The Young Guard (Sergei Gerasimov) as Shulga (his scenes later were cut out)
 1949 Konstantin Zaslonov as Secretary of Raion Committee (Stalin Prize, 1950)
 1949 Fairy Tales of Kuban (Ivan Pyryev) as Denis Koren
 1951 Taras Shevchenko (Ihor Savchenko) as Mr. Barabash
 1952 May nights as the Head
 1958 Over Tissa as Gromada, general of the border guards
 1961 Evenings at a khutir near Dykanka (Aleksandr Rou) as Chub
 1962 Queen of the Gas Station as Priest, the bus passenger
 1964 Jack Frost (Aleksandr Rou) as Jack Frost
 1968 The Diamond Arm (Leonid Gaidai) as Boris Savelyevich
 The end of Chyrva Kozyr as Chyrva
 Secretary of the Oblast Committee as Sukhodolov
others

See also
 Gammalsvenskby

References

External links
 Encyclopedia of Ukraine
 The same Parkhomenko. Rabochaya Gazeta February 21, 2009 
 Profile at Kulichki.com 
 

1905 births
1976 deaths
People from Donetsk Oblast
Soviet male stage actors
Soviet male film actors
Ukrainian male film actors
Ukrainian people of Swedish descent
Ukrainian male stage actors
People's Artists of the RSFSR
Stalin Prize winners
Burials at Kuntsevo Cemetery
Communist Party of the Soviet Union members